Opuntia fuliginosa is a species of prickly pear cactus found in the Sonoran Desert in Mexico.

References

External links
 
 

fuliginosa